Nick Bootland (born July 21, 1978) is a Canadian former professional ice hockey player. He later served as the head coach and director of hockey operations of the Kalamazoo Wings in the ECHL, a position he has held from May 29, 2008. In August, 2022, it was announced that would be leaving to take the head coaching position with the Hershey Bears of the AHL.  His brother, Darryl, played in the NHL for the Detroit Red Wings and New York Islanders.

Bootland was selected by the Dallas Stars in the 9th round (220th overall) of the 1996 NHL Entry Draft.

Career statistics

References

External links

1978 births
Living people
Canadian ice hockey right wingers
Cincinnati Cyclones (ECHL) players
Cleveland Barons (2001–2006) players
Columbus Stars players
Dallas Stars draft picks
Guelph Storm players
Hershey Bears players
Kalamazoo Wings (2007–2009) players
Kalamazoo Wings (UHL) players